Carlos Nahuel Benavídez Protesoni (born 30 March 1998) is a Uruguayan professional footballer who plays as midfielder for Spanish club Deportivo Alavés.

Club career
Born in Montevideo, Benavídez began his career with hometown side Defensor Sporting, making his first team debut in 2016 at the age of 18. He became a regular starter in 2017, and moved to Argentine Primera División side Independiente.

On 1 July 2022, Benavídez signed a two-year contract with Spanish Segunda División team Deportivo Alavés.

References

External links

1998 births
Living people
Uruguayan footballers
Uruguayan expatriate footballers
Uruguay under-20 international footballers
Association football midfielders
Uruguayan Primera División players
Argentine Primera División players
Defensor Sporting players
Club Atlético Independiente footballers
Deportivo Alavés players
Uruguayan expatriate sportspeople in Argentina
Uruguayan expatriate sportspeople in Spain
Expatriate footballers in Argentina
Expatriate footballers in Spain